Progress is an unincorporated community in Monroe Township, Delaware County, Indiana.

History
A post office was established at Progress in 1900, and was discontinued the next year, in 1901. The name embodies the spirit of progress.

Geography

References 

Unincorporated communities in Delaware County, Indiana
Unincorporated communities in Indiana